Korymbos is an Ancient Greek word for a cluster of flowers or fruit.

Korymbos may refer to:

Corymb, a botanical term for a type of branched inflorescence
Corymbus, Greek god of the fruit of the ivy
Korymbos, a globe-like cloth used on the crowns of the Sasanian kings of Iran